O. chinensis may refer to:
 Onthophagus chinensis, a scarab beetle species in the genus Onthophagus
 Osbeckia chinensis, a plant species
 Oscaria chinensis, a synonym for Primula sinensis, the Chinese primrose, a plant species

See also 
 Chinensis (disambiguation)